During the 1999–2000 English football season, Aston Villa competed in the FA Premier League (known as the FA Carling Premiership for sponsorship reasons).

Season summary
Aston Villa matched their previous season's solid sixth place finish. After starting the campaign brightly, a run of nine matches without a win dragged Villa down to 15th. However, after that Villa rallied to go 12 matches unbeaten, and thereafter lost only two more games all season to finish sixth. Villa also reached the FA Cup final for the first time in 43 years, but their hopes of winning the famous trophy for the eighth time were ended by a 1–0 defeat at the hands of Chelsea, whose success was achieved in the last game at Wembley before the old stadium was rebuilt.

Final league table

Results summary

Results by matchday

Results
Aston Villa's score comes first

Legend

FA Premier League

FA Cup

League Cup

Players

First-team squad
Squad at end of season

Left club during season

Reserve squad
The following players spend most of the season playing for the reserves, and did not appear for the first team.

Under-19 squad
The following players spent most of the season playing for the under-19 squad, but may have played for the U-17s and reserves.

Under-17 squad
The following players spent most of the season playing for the under-17 squad, but may have played for the U-19s and reserves.

Other players
The following players did not appear for any squad this season.

Statistics

Starting 11

Transfers

In

Out

Transfers in:  £8,100,000
Transfers out:  £4,570,000
Total spending:  £3,530,000

Notes

References

External links
Aston Villa official website
avfchistory.co.uk 1999–2000 season

Aston Villa F.C. seasons
Aston Villa